Metal Gear Solid Mobile is an action-adventure stealth video game developed by Ideaworks Game Studio and published by Konami for mobile phones. A spin-off of the Metal Gear series, it was first unveiled in Kojima Productions' 20th Anniversary party. The game was released worldwide in 2008. Konami offered the game as a paid download or pre-installed in a Metal Gear-branded cell phone. It shows Solid Snake in his attire from Metal Gear Solid 2: Sons of Liberty.

On February 14, 2008, Metal Gear Solid Mobile won the "Grand Prix" and "Operator's Choice" awards at the 2008 International Mobile Gaming Awards.

Metal Gear Solid Mobile was later released on the N-Gage platform. The new version features original content, 3D art and camera works, an in-game camouflage system, and additional controls specific for N-Gage mobile devices. This version of the game was released on December 11, 2008.

Story
The story takes place between Metal Gear Solid and Metal Gear Solid 2: Sons of Liberty, after Revolver Ocelot has leaked technical information on Metal Gear REX to the world. As a counter-measure, Solid Snake and Otacon form Philanthropy, an anti-Metal Gear organization whose goal is the complete eradication of all Metal Gears. Otacon quickly receives his first lead on development of a new Metal Gear. AI programmer Dr. Victoria Reed has agreed to reveal new details on the Metal Gear in exchange for assistance in her escape.

Midway through the mission however, it turns out Victoria Reed means VR. Snake finds out the Otacon he is talking to is part of a giant VR simulation. Otacon from the outside world then breaks in and helps guide Snake out of the VR simulation. Snake fights "The Commander" on top of a VR Metal Gear Rex. After defeating him, Snake wakes up to unnamed voices speaking. They say that while Snake did prove useful, he failed to provide them with the battle data they needed for the Project, and they instruct someone to erase all memories of the simulation and dump him back where they kidnapped him. One unnamed voice then says that they already have the second test subject lined up. One of the voices then says, "...Let's see if Jack can do better."

References

External links
Official website 

2008 video games
Mobile games
N-Gage service games
Single-player video games
Video games developed in the United Kingdom
Metal Gear spin-off games